Pilane may refer to:

 Pilane (Botswana)
 Pilane (Sweden)